Last Rites is a 1975 Australian comedy about a writer and his man servant who try to convince the world that the writer has gone mad.

References

External links

Australian comedy films
1975 films
1975 comedy films
1970s English-language films
1970s Australian films